Misguided Roses is singer/guitarist Edwin McCain's second album released by Lava Records. It was originally issued on June 24, 1997. "I'll Be", a very successful single in 1998, came from this record.  Although "I'll Be" was the only successful single from the album, the track "See the Sky Again" also received some airplay.  The album was recorded at the House of Therm Studios and Love Grotto, both in Nashville, Tennessee, and Doppler Studios in Atlanta, Georgia.

Track listing
All tracks composed by McCain. Except "Stop Thinking 'Bout That" by James Taylor & Daniel Kortchmar.
 "See the Sky Again" – 4:08
 "Grind Me in the Gears" – 4:21
 "Cleveland Park" – 4:27
 "I'll Be" – 4:26
 "How Strange It Seems" – 4:12
 "The Rhythm Of Life" – 5:28
 "Punish Me" – 5:06
 "Darwin's Children" – 4:14
 "Take Me" – 4:14
 "(I've Got To) Stop Thinking 'Bout That" – 3:50
 "What Matters" – 5:16
 "Holy City" – 11:54

Hidden Track: The song "Through The Floor" follows the song "Holy City"

Personnel
Scott Bannevich – bass guitar
Larry Chaney – electric guitar, cuatro, lap steel guitar
Beth Nielsen Chapman – background vocals 
Bob Clearmountain – mixing
Ashley Cleveland – background vocals 
Eric Darken – percussion, pandeiro
Richard Dodd – mixing
Larry Freemantle – art direction
Kenny Greenberg – acoustic guitar, dobro, electric guitar, 12-string guitar
Vicki Hampton – background vocals
Dave Harrison – percussion, drums
Bob Ludwig – mastering
Clay McBride – photography
Edwin McCain – guitar, lead vocals, background vocals
Michael McDonald – background vocals
Carl Meadows – engineer
Hans Neleman – cover design
Joseph M. Palmaccio – mastering
Matt Rollings – organ, synthesizer, piano, producer, wurlitzer, anvil
Matt Serletic – producer
Craig Shields – keyboards, alto sax, baritone sax, soprano sax, tenor sax, wind controller
Russ Taff – background vocals
Jeff Tomei – engineer

Charts

Weekly charts

Year-end charts

Singles

References

External links

1997 albums
Edwin McCain albums
Lava Records albums
Albums produced by Kenny Greenberg
Albums produced by Matt Serletic